Jeremy "Twitch" Stenberg (born September 27, 1981) is an American professional freestyle motocross rider and professional off-road truck racer. Stenberg received his nickname "Twitch" from his Tourette's syndrome, which he was diagnosed with at the age of eight. He started riding dirtbikes at the age of two so his father could spend more time with him and keep him out of their dangerous neighbourhood. He is a born again Christian.

Other projects

In 2006, Stenberg starred in MTV's True Life: I Have Tourette's Syndrome.

In 2011, VH1 debuted their reality series The X-Life, in which Stenberg co-stars alongside BMX dirt rider Cory Nastazio, skateboard vert champion Pierre-Luc Gagnon (aka PLG) and their families.

Stenberg has been racing off-road trucks in the Lucas Oil Off Road Racing Series and he won the 2010 Super Lite season championship. In 2015, he competed in the X Games' Stadium Super Trucks category, but failed to qualify for the final after finishing fourth and last in his heat race and the Last Chance Qualifier, respectively.

Stenberg also had his own DVD called Twitch: Hoodrich.

Career accomplishments

 1998 Vans Triple Crown Champ
 1998 Las Vegas LXD Freestyle and Step Up – 1st
 2004 Vans Triple Crown Champ
 2004 X-Fighters – 2nd 
 2005 Dew Action Sports Pro Tour Toyota Challenge – 1st
 2005 Dew Action Sports Pro Tour FMX Overall Points – 2nd
 2005 X-Fighters – 2nd
 2008 ESPN Moto X Championships FMX – Silver
 2008 ESPN Moto X Championships Speed & Style – Bronze
 2008 Red Bull X-Fighters Brazil – 1st
 2008 Red Bull X-Fighters Texas – 2nd
 2008 LG Action Sports FMX World Championships – 1st 
 2010 Lucas Oil Off Road Racing Series Super Lite Truck champion

X Games Comeptition History

References

External links
 X Games profile
 AST Dew Tour profile
 https://web.archive.org/web/20081001034033/http://www.metalmulisha.com/team/index.php?rider_id=12
 http://espn.go.com/action/xgames/summer/2010/motox/news/story?page=summer-x-16-moto-x-speed-style-results

American motocross riders
Living people
1981 births
Stadium Super Trucks drivers
X Games athletes
Motorcycle racers from San Diego
People with Tourette syndrome
Freestyle motocross riders
People from Spring Valley, San Diego County, California
Christians from California